Morafenobe Airport is an airport in Morafenobe, Melaky Region, Madagascar .

Airlines and destinations

References

Airports in Madagascar
Melaky